Father Lake is a freshwater body, a tributary of Doda Lake, in the southern part of Eeyou Istchee James Bay (municipality), in the administrative region of Nord-du-Québec, in the province of Quebec, in Canada. Father Lake is part of the hydrographic slopes of the Opawica River, the Waswanipi River, the Matagami Lake, the Nottaway River and the James Bay.

The area of Father Lake extends into the townships of Picquet, Royal and Du Guesclin on the territory of the Eeyou Istchee James Bay (municipality) Regional Government, southwest of Chapais, Quebec.

Forestry is the main economic activity of the sector. Recreational tourism activities come second, thanks to a navigable body of water of  length, including the Doda Lake (in the North-East) and the Françoise Lake (to the northwest). The latter is formed by an enlargement of the Opawica River and has a dam built at its mouth.

This peninsula is surrounded to the north by lake Du Guesclin and Françoise Lake; to the East and to the South by Doda Lake; Southwest, by Father Lake. The large bays of this peninsula give the shape of an F at Father Lake.

The surface of Father Lake is generally frozen from early November to mid-May, however, safe ice movement is generally from mid-November to mid-April.

Geography

Notes and references

See also 

Eeyou Istchee James Bay
Lakes of Nord-du-Québec
Nottaway River drainage basin